Jimenez, officially the Municipality of Jimenez, is a 3rd class municipality in the province of Misamis Occidental, Philippines. According to the 2020 census, it has a population of 28,909 people.

Within the predominantly Catholic town lies the Church of Saint John the Baptist which is one of the oldest monuments in the Philippines. Many Jimeneznons live outside the country but have retained close ties to the town, with "balikbayans" offering community service and philanthropy, and others taking up residence upon retirement abroad.

The heritage town is one of the best preserved colonial towns in the entire Philippines. The conservation, preservation, and restoration of the town's heritage structures such as the church and ancestral houses are the main focus of the local government. The town is being pushed to be included in the UNESCO World Heritage List.

Geography

Climate

Barangays
Jimenez is politically subdivided into 24 barangays.

Demographics

Economy

Education
Jimenez has three major high schools including School of Saint John the Baptist, Jimenez Bethel Institute, and a public high school located in barangay Corrales.

List of presumed Cultural Properties of the Philippines in Jimenez
The following table lists down built heritage structures as identified by the local government of Jimenez: 

This table lists down built heritage structures not formally identified by the local government of Jimenez but are pursuant to the Republic Act No. 10066 or the National Heritage Law of 2009:

References

External links
 [ Philippine Standard Geographic Code]
 Philippine Census Information
 Local Governance Performance Management System 

Municipalities of Misamis Occidental
1900 establishments in the Philippines